Minetti may refer to:

People
Massimo Minetti, Italian footballer
Bernhard Minetti, German actor
Annalisa Minetti, Italian singer
Nicole Minetti, Italian showgirl associated with Silvio Berlusconi

Other uses
Palacio Minetti, a building in Argentina
Minetti Sports Cars, a company in Australia
Mineti, a colloquial vulgarism for blowjob in Georgian language

Italian-language surnames